Eoconodon is an extinct genus of triisodontid mesonychid that existed during the early Paleocene of North America.  Characteristics of the genus include massive jaws, blunt builds, and strong canine teeth.
 
Living individuals were about the size of a modern house cat, but were considered giant for mammals at the time.

Species
 Eoconodon copanus
 Eoconodon coryphaeus
 Eoconodon ginibitohia
 Eoconodon heilprinianus
 Eoconodon nidhoggi

References

Mesonychids
Paleocene mammals of North America
Paleocene genus extinctions
Fossil taxa described in 1921
Prehistoric placental genera